Over the Garden Wall is a lost 1919 American silent romantic comedy film produced and distributed by the Vitagraph Company of America. It was directed by David Smith, brother of one of the Vitagraph founders Albert E. Smith. The film stars Bessie Love.

At least five short films with this title were filmed before this production.

Plot 

When the poor Gordon family must move out of its house and into a small cottage, young Peggy Gordon (Love) becomes a gardener to earn money. Her wealthy neighbor falls in love her, after seeing her "over the garden wall" and through a tennis racket; but she mistakenly believes that he is a chauffeur. When her younger sister attempts to elope with a bad man, Peggy and her new beau successfully prevent this from happening, and her beau's wealthy identity is revealed.

Cast

Reception 
The film was generally well received.

References 
Notes

Citations

External links 

 
 
 
 Lobby card featuring Bessie Love

1919 lost films
1919 romantic comedy films
1919 films
American black-and-white films
American romantic comedy films
American silent feature films
Films based on American novels
Films directed by David Smith (director)
Films with screenplays by Sam Taylor (director)
Lost American films
Vitagraph Studios films
Lost romantic comedy films
1910s American films
Silent romantic comedy films
Silent American comedy films
1910s English-language films